Daniel Oscar Tagata served as the President of the Asociación de Scouts del Perú, as well as the Community Development Executive and Director for Management Development of the Interamerican Scout Office.

A Peruvian of Japanese descent, Tagata was awarded the 263rd Bronze Wolf, the only distinction of the World Organization of the Scout Movement, awarded by the World Scout Committee for exceptional services to world Scouting, in 1997.

References

External links

Recipients of the Bronze Wolf Award
Year of birth missing
Scouting and Guiding in Peru
Peruvian people of Japanese descent